Amberpet Assembly constituency is a constituency of Telangana Legislative Assembly, India. It is one of 15 constituencies in Capital city of Hyderabad. It is part of Secunderabad Lok Sabha constituency.

Kaleru Venkatesh is the MLA Member of Legislative Assembly, TRS candidate from Amberpet constituency who won in 2018 elections in Telangana. G.Kishan Reddy BJP leader did not win from Amberpet constituency in 2018 elections. He won 3 times as MLA being a BJP candidate.

Extent of the constituency
Amberpet was carved out of Himayat Nagar Assembly constituency before the 2009 elections as per Delimitation Act of 2002.

The Assembly Constituency presently comprises the following neighbourhoods:

Members of Legislative Assembly

Election results

Telangana Legislative Assembly election, 2018

Telangana Legislative Assembly election, 2014

See also
 Amberpet
 List of constituencies of Telangana Legislative Assembly

References

Assembly constituencies of Telangana
Politics of Hyderabad, India